John H. Krehbiel Jr. (born 1938) was the co-chairman of the Fortune 500 company Molex Incorporated, a global supplier of electronic & fiberoptic connectors, before selling the company to Koch Industries for $7.2 billion in 2013. In 2006, he made the Forbes list of billionaires. Krehbiel is a Life Trustee of Illinois Institute of Technology.

Personal life
Krehbiel and his wife Karen Gray-Krehbiel, a civic volunteer and philanthropist, live in Chicago. Krehbiel and his former wife Kennetha Love Krehbiel (Posy) had three children: Fred Love Krehbiel (Pete) (1965-2020), John H. Krehbiel III (Yaz) and Margaret V. Krehbiel (Meg). He has one brother, Fred A. Krehbiel.

References

Living people
1938 births
American chief executives
American billionaires

20th-century American businesspeople